Helen Adjoa Ntoso (born February 1958) is a Ghanaian politician and a member of the Parliament of Ghana for the Krachi West constituency in the Volta Region of Ghana. She is a member of the National Democratic Congress. Hon Ntoso is A former Regional Minister for the Volta Region.

Early life and education 
Ntoso is from Kete Krachi in then Volta Region but now Oti Region. She completed her post-secondary education at St Francis Training College. She has an Advanced Diploma in Education from Lambeth College in London. She also holds a Master of Arts in Conflict Peace and Security from  Kofi Annan International Peacekeeping Training Centre.

Career 
She was a Senior Child Care taker at Elizabeth Hamwod Nursery School from 2005 to 2007. She was a Missionary for Bright Church Army from 2003 to 2005. She was also the Director of Operations at NADMO 2009 to 2012.

Political career 
She was a regional minister from 2013 to 2016 (Office of the President). She was the Volta Regional Minister in 2015.

Awards 
Helen Ntoso won an award for Regional Minister of the Year 2015, organized by West African International Magazine.

References 

Living people
Ghanaian MPs 2009–2013
People from Volta Region
Ghanaian Protestant missionaries
National Democratic Congress (Ghana) politicians
1958 births
21st-century Ghanaian women politicians
Ghanaian MPs 2021–2025